Omega Delta Phi Fraternity, Inc., also known as O-D-Phi is a multicultural fraternity that was founded on November 25, 1987, at Texas Tech University in Lubbock, Texas. Its seven founders known as the "Men of Vision" to fraternity members wanted to create an organization to help students graduate. This initial organization became Omega Delta Phi Fraternity. Over the past thirty years the Fraternity has changed and adopted other values such as an emphasis on Community Service. Omega Delta Phi was named Fraternity of the Year for 2003, 2004, and 2005 by the National Association of Latino Fraternal Organizations (NALFO). Although one of the Greek organizations that founded NALFO, Omega Delta Phi withdrew their membership in December 2008.

Omega Delta Phi is a multicultural service/social fraternity that aims at graduating its members while giving back to the community. The Fraternity has established itself on over 70 campuses and is predominantly centered in Texas and the Southwest. Although founded mainly by Latinos, the fraternity has traditionally always been open to men of different backgrounds.

In the early 1990s, Omega Delta Phi chapters were established in university systems such as the Texas A&M University System, University of Texas System, New Mexico and Arizona systems. Later on, because of the increasing popularity of the Internet, the fraternity experienced growth and chapters were founded in cities such as the Dallas/Fort Worth Metroplex area, Houston, and Seattle. The fraternity established a short-lived international colony in Mexico City, Mexico as well. 
In 2000, Omega Delta Phi founded an alumni association to provide a support group for its alumni base. The fraternity now has several alumni chapters throughout the U.S. and Mexico The organization now has chapters, colonies, and clubs on both the west and east coasts.

History

Founding
Omega Delta Phi was founded by the following seven individuals in the fall of 1987 at Texas Tech University:

Joe Cereceres
Eugene Dominguez
Arturo Barraza
Juan Barraza
Tommy Hurtado
Dwight Christopher Forbes
Elliot Bazan

According to members of Omega Delta Phi, the fraternity was the brainchild of Joe Cereceres. Joe Cereceres is credited as being the founder who came up with the idea of starting the fraternity. Cereceres, seeing how a male organization with a similar fraternal structure could be beneficial, began searching for others that would share in his vision. After getting together six other men they began to have weekly meetings. These meetings consisted of informal discussions about what they were going to do as a group. At the time not everyone was on board with starting a Fraternal organization because of the negative stigma that surrounded Fraternities. However, after many lengthy meetings the group decided that they could change that stigma through positive actions. They decided to focus on graduation and service as the main goals of their new organization. On November 25, 1987, the group was officially recognized as a Fraternity and granted Charter status from Texas Tech University. In 1988 Omega Delta Phi initiated its first class with 12 new members that would later be known as the Charter Class.

Early history
Much of Omega Delta Phi's early history dealt with finding an identity. It was at this time that many of the first traditions of the fraternity were born. The Crest, as well as the sacraments, and motifs were adopted during this time. It was also at this time that the practice of consumption of any alcohol while wearing Omega Delta Phi paraphernalia was forbidden. An identity issue that arose was whether or not the organization would identify itself as a social or service organization. In the end the organization identified itself as a "service/social" organization. During this early history, word has spread about Omega Delta Phi to another man named Jaime Mendez. Mendez seeing the potential in the organization started his own chapter of Omega Delta Phi at the University of Texas at El Paso. The chapter was founded without the consent of the original Texas Tech Chapter.  After some minor controversy, the chapters reconciled their differences and set up an expansion strategy that spread across the country.

Chapters and colonies

Philanthropy

Court-appointed special advocates
In 2009, Omega Delta Phi became the second Greek Letter Organization to officially partner with Court Appointed Special Advocates (CASA).

CASA is a national organization that supports court-appointed advocates for abused or neglected children. While you must be 21 years of age to become a court-appointed advocate for a child in need, each undergraduate entity partners with their local CASA office to assist the philanthropic organization. The members of Omega Delta Phi provide CASA with both manpower at local CASA events and assist in raising funds for CASA.

Given that most of the members of the fraternity are first-generation college students, Omega Delta Phi is keen on getting people in our communities to be advocates for our foster kids.

Annual conferences

National conference
Each summer, Omega Delta Phi hosts an annual conference where all entities and alumni are invited to attend. Brothers participate in meetings, workshops, networking sessions as well as showcases where teams from entities compete in various competitions. The National Alumni Association also has hosts their meetings, as well as the board of directors. Brothers also have a chance to hear from the future leaders of the fraternity during election years.

National undergraduate conference

Each winter, Omega Delta Phi entities meet in a similar conference to the one during the summer, but on a smaller scale (known as "NUC"). The conference is heavily focused on meetings and workshops to prepare for the upcoming spring semesters.

Recognition

Texas Tech Room
In the summer of 2002, Texas Tech University, where the fraternity was founded in 1987, honored the fraternity by dedicating a conference room to Omega Delta Phi. Currently, the organization is collecting donations to fund a renovation of the room.

NALFO Awards
Prior to leaving the NALFO council (Omega Delta Phi is currently a member of NIC), Omega Delta Phi received the following awards from NALFO.

2006
Campus Leadership Excellence- Undergraduate: Andrew Ortiz
Undergraduate Philanthropist of the Year: Andrew Ortiz (tie)
Rising Professional Alumni: Alex Alvarez
Undergraduate Chapter of the Year: Omega Delta Phi, Xi Chapter
Alumni/Graduate Chapter of the Year: DFW Alumni Association 2005
Alumni/Graduate Chapter of the Year: Omega Delta Phi, Dallas/Ft. Worth
Philanthropic Excellence – Alumni: Omega Delta Phi DFW Alumni Association
Philanthropic Excellence – Undergraduate: Omega Delta Phi – Lambda Chapter
Professional of the Year (tie): Andrew Ortiz, Omega Delta Phi
Organization (Fraternity) of the Year: Omega Delta Phi Fraternity, Inc

2004
Alumni / Graduate Chapter of the Year: Omega Delta Phi, Dallas/Ft. Worth
Philanthropic Excellence (Graduate / Alumni): Omega Delta Phi, Dallas/Ft. Worth
Organizational Leadership Excellence: Alejandro Rios, Omega Delta Phi
Undergraduate Excellence: Darrell A. Rodriguez, Omega Delta Phi
Organization (Fraternity) of the Year: Omega Delta Phi Fraternity, Inc.

2003
Undergraduate Chapter of the Year: Gamma Chapter
Rising Professional: David Ortiz
Outstanding Web Presence: Dallas Ft. Worth Alumni
Community and Educational Planning: Pi Chapter
Alumni Chapter of the Year: Dallas/Ft. Worth Alumni
Organization (Fraternity) of the Year: Omega Delta Phi Fraternity, Inc.

2002
Community and Education Planning: Alpha Beta Chapter Michigan State University – Young Knights

2001
Academic Excellence – Graduate: David A. Ortiz
Alumnus – Alumnae of the Year: David A. Ortiz

See also
List of social fraternities and sororities

References

 
North American Interfraternity Conference
Student societies in the United States
Hispanic and Latino American organizations
Youth organizations based in Arizona
Organizations based in Phoenix, Arizona
Student organizations established in 1987
1987 establishments in Texas